William Merritt Chase Alternative School is a six-year (7-12) alternative school of the Gary Community School Corporation in Gary, Indiana, United States.

History 
William Merritt Chase Alternative School, named after William Merritt Chase the artist, and was founded to educate dropouts and at-risk students.

Many years ago, before the year 2000, William Merritt Chase School was not an Alternative School and served to educate children from varied social economic backgrounds and ethnicities.

References

External links 
William Merritt Chase Alternative School Official Site

Public high schools in Indiana
Schools in Gary, Indiana
Public middle schools in Indiana
Alternative schools in the United States